The Turkish Journalists' Association (TGC) is an association for journalists in Turkey.

It was founded on 10 June 1946, shortly after the abolition of the Turkish Press Union (Türk Basın Birliği), membership of which had been required by law for journalists. Past chairmen include Nail Güreli.

It awards the Sedat Simavi Awards annually to recognize Turkish journalists' achievements in a variety of categories, in honour of TGC co-founder Sedat Simavi.

Established in 1988, the TGC Press Media Museum in Çemberlitaş, Fatih, Istanbul is owned by the Association.

References

External links
 Official website

1946 establishments in Turkey
Trade unions in Turkey
Turkish journalism organizations

Trade unions established in 1946